The coracohumeral ligament is a broad ligament of the shoulder. It attaches to the coracoid process at one end, and to the greater and lesser tubercles of the humerus at the other (as two discrete bands). It strengthens the upper part of the joint capsule of the shoulder joint.

Anatomy 
The coracohumeral ligament arises from the lateral border or the base of the coracoid process. It passes obliquely downwards and laterally to the front of the greater tubercle of the humerus. It forms two bands - an anterior one and a posterior one - that insert into the lesser and greater tubercles of the humerus, respectively.

The two bands of the CCL blend with the joint capsule; the ligament is intimately united with the capsule by its posterior and inferior border, but its anterior and superior border presents a free edge which overlaps the capsule. The CCL also blends with the tendon of the supraspinatus muscle, and the subscapularis muscle.

Anatomical relations 
The CCL is situated superior to the head of the humerus.

Function 
The coracohumeral ligament strengthens the upper part of the shoulder joint capsule. It becomes taut with external rotation of the glenohumeral joint.

Clinical significance 
The coracohumeral ligament may be viewed using ultrasound of the shoulder.

See also 
 Glenohumeral ligaments
 Coraco-acromial ligament
 Acromioclavicular ligament

References

External links 
 

Ligaments of the upper limb